The canton of Levallois-Perret is an administrative division of the Hauts-de-Seine department, in northern France. It was created at the French canton reorganisation which came into effect in March 2015. Its seat is in Levallois-Perret.

It consists of the following communes:
Levallois-Perret

References

Cantons of Hauts-de-Seine